The 2023 U-20 Africa Cup of Nations, known as the 2023 U20 AFCON or 2023 AFCON U20 for short and as the 2023 TotalEnergies U-20 Africa Cup of Nations for sponsorship purposes, was the 17th edition (24th if editions of the tournament without hosts are included) of the biennial African international youth football tournament organized by the Confederation of African Football, currently hosted in Egypt from 19 February to 11 March 2023.

This edition of the tournament also doubles as the African qualifiers for the 2023 FIFA U-20 World Cup in Indonesia where teams who reached the semi-finals stage qualified automatically.

Ghana were the defending champions following their 4th title win in 2021, but failed to qualify for this edition after losing to Nigeria in the WAFU sub-regional qualification tournament.

Qualification

Player eligibility
Players born 1 January 2003 or later are eligible to participate in the competition.

Qualified teams
The following 12 teams qualified for the group stages:

Venues

Match officials
On 18 February 2023, CAF announced a total of 16 referees (including 2 women), 18 assistant referees (including 4 women) and 6 video assistant referees (VAR) appointed for the tournament.

Referees

  Issa Mouhamed
  Hamidou Diero
  Mohamed Athoumani
  Yannick Kabanga Malala
  Clement Franklin Kpan
  Mohamed Diraneh Guedi
  Mahmoud Ahmed Nagy
  Lamin Jammeh
  Ahmed Abdulrazg
  Sory Ibrahima Keita
  Jallal Jayed
  Bouchra Karboubi
  Omar Abdulkadir Artan
  Jean-Claude Ishimwe
  El Hadj Amadou Sy
  Akhona Makalima

Assistant referees

  Hamza Bouzit
  Pascal Ndimunzigo
  Styven Moutsassi
  Yara Atef
  Mohamed Abouzid Sami Halhal
  Yehualashet Fasika Biru
  Roland Nii Dodoo
  Joel Wonka Doe
  Dimbiniaina Andriatianarivelo
  Fanta Idrissa Kone
  Fatiha Jermoumi
  Soukaina Hamdi
  Abdoul Aziz Moctar Saley
  Igho Hope
  Shaji Padayachy
  Omer Hamid Mohamed Ahmed
  Jonathan Ahonto Koffi
  Mohamed Bakir

Video assistant referees

  Elvis Noupoue
  Mahmoud Ashour
  Ahmed Elghandour
  Daniel Nii Laryea
  Dahane Beida
  El Hadj Malick Samba

Squads

Draw
The draw for the group stage was held at CAF's headquarters in Cairo, Egypt on 23 December 2022 at 19:00 EST (UTC+2). The 12 teams were drawn into 3 groups of 4 with the teams seeded according to their performance in the previous edition of the tournament. Hosts Egypt automatically seeded and assigned to Position A1 in the draw.

Group stage
The top two teams of each group advance to the quarter-finals along with the two best 3rd-placed teams.

Tiebreakers
Teams are ranked according to points (3 for a win, 1 for a draw and none for a loss), and if tied on points, the following tie-breaking criteria are applied, in the order given, to determine the rankings (Regulations Article 13).
 Points in head-to-head matches among tied teams;
 Goal difference in head-to-head matches among tied teams;
 Goals scored in head-to-head matches among tied teams;
 If more than two teams are tied, and after applying all head-to-head criteria above, a subset of teams are still tied, all head-to-head criteria above are reapplied exclusively to this subset of teams;
 Goal difference in all group matches;
 Goals scored in all group matches;
 Drawing of lots.

All times are in EST (UTC+2).

Group A

Group B

Group C

Ranking of third-placed teams

Knockout stage

Quarter-finals
Winners qualify for the 2023 FIFA U-20 World Cup.

Semi-finals

Third place

Final

Goalscorers

Awards 
The following awards were given at the conclusion of the tournament:

Team of the Tournament

Qualified teams for the FIFA U-20 World Cup
The following teams from CAF qualified for the 2023 FIFA U-20 World Cup in Indonesia.

1 Bold indicates champions for that year. Italic indicates hosts for that year.

See also 
 2023 U-17 Africa Cup of Nations

References

2023 FIFA U-20 World Cup qualification
2023 in African football
2023 in youth association football
Africa U-20 Cup of Nations
International association football competitions hosted by Egypt
2023 Africa U-20 Cup of Nations
Africa Cup of Nations
Africa Cup of Nations